Alex Crockett (born 20 November 1981 in Bath, Somerset, England) is a former English rugby union player, who played at centre.

Career
Crockett started his professional career at Bath.

He was called into the England Saxons squad to face Italy A in Ragusa, Sicily on 9 February 2008.

He was appointed joint captain (with Michael Lipman) for Bath in the 2008/9 season

Crockett resigned from Bath along with co-captain Michael Lipman, and Andrew Higgins on 1 June 2009

On 4 December 2009, it was announced that Crockett had signed a contract with Bristol which will last until the end of the 2009/10 season. Crockett joined Bristol for training in January but was unable to play a competitive game until 1 March 2010.

His first game for his new club came against Nottingham in the British and Irish Cup on 7 March 2010. Bristol won the game with Crockett scoring a try in the first half.

Crockett signed for Worcester Warriors on 2 June 2010 on a two-year deal. In 2012, it was announced Crockett would leave Worcester Warriors at the end of the season.

On 23 May 2012, Crockett signed for Newcastle Falcons on a two-year contract for the 2012 to 2013 season. On 20 May 2014, Crockett announced his retirement from professional rugby.

References

External links
Bath profile
England profile
Crockett's double destroys Irish
Crockett sidelined after surgery
Crockett signs new Bath contract
Bristol profile

1981 births
Living people
Rugby union centres
Rugby union players from Bath, Somerset
English rugby union players
Doping cases in rugby union
Bath Rugby players
People educated at Colston's School